Euseius zambiaensis is a species of mite in the family Phytoseiidae.

References

zambiaensis
Articles created by Qbugbot
Animals described in 2001